Eulepidotis sylpha is a moth of the family Erebidae first described by Harrison Gray Dyar Jr. in 1914. It is found in the Neotropics, including Costa Rica and Mexico.

References

Moths described in 1914
sylpha